Andi Hoti (born 2 March 2003) is a professional footballer who plays as a centre-back for German club SC Freiburg II, on loan from Italian club Inter Milan. Born in Switzerland, he has represented Kosovo at under-21 international level.

Club career

Inter Milan
In January 2020, Hoti joined the youth team of Serie A club Inter Milan. Inter Milan reportedly paid a €150,000 transfer fee. On 19 July 2021, he signed his first professional contract with Inter Milan after agreeing to a three-year deal.

Loan at SC Freiburg II
On 18 July 2022, Hoti joined 3. Liga side SC Freiburg II, on a season-long loan. On 6 August 2022, he made his debut in a 1–0 away win against SpVgg Bayreuth after being named in the starting line-up.

International career
On 27 June 2018, Hoti received a call-up from Kosovo U15 for a training camp in Lindabrunn. On 8 October 2019, he was named as part of the Kosovo U17 squad for 2020 UEFA European Under-17 Championship qualifications. His debut with Kosovo U17 came a day later in a 2020 UEFA European Under-17 Championship qualification match against Netherlands U17 after being named in the starting line-up.

On 22 May 2021, Hoti received a call-up from Kosovo U21 for a 2023 UEFA European Under-21 Championship qualification match against the Andorra U21, he was an unused substitute in that match. His debut with Kosovo U21 came on 7 September 2021 in a 2023 UEFA European Under-21 Championship qualification match against England U21 after being named in the starting line-up.

Personal life
Hoti was born in Uster, Switzerland to Kosovo Albanian parents from the village Ratkoc of Rahovec.

References

External links

2003 births
Living people
People from Uster
Kosovan footballers
Kosovo youth international footballers
Kosovo under-21 international footballers
Swiss men's footballers
Swiss people of Kosovan descent
Swiss people of Albanian descent
Association football central defenders
Inter Milan players
3. Liga players
SC Freiburg II players
FC Zürich players
Sportspeople from the canton of Zürich
Swiss expatriate footballers
Kosovan expatriate footballers
Kosovan expatriate sportspeople in Italy
Kosovan expatriate sportspeople in Germany
Swiss expatriate sportspeople in Italy
Swiss expatriate sportspeople in Germany
Expatriate footballers in Germany
Expatriate footballers in Italy